Oleh Venhlinskyi (born 21 March 1978, Kiev, Ukrainian SSR) is former a Ukrainian football player.

Professional career
Oleh Venhlinskyi began his career with the Ukrainian powerhouse Dynamo Kyiv, but made a name for himself after moving to Dnipro Dnipropetrovsk. He spent a long stint in the Dynamo's second team, but after transferring to Dnipropetrovsk he has become a favorite after scoring a couple of impressive and decisive goals in Ukrainian Championship and UEFA Cup for Dnipro Dnipropetrovsk.

In 2003, he was promised by experts an overwhelming career after earning the Ukrainian Footballer of the Year award. However, Venhlynskyi is renowned for his numerous injuries that have hampered his career at certain points in his life. In 2005, he left Dnipro Dnipropetrovsk for AEK Athens FC in Greece, but was unable to solidify a first-place spot at the club. After a full-season with AEK Athens FC, Oleh returned to Ukraine to sign contract with Chornomorets Odessa for three years. In 2009, he left as his contract expired.

Stats for reserve squads

Stats for main squads

International 
His first international game Venhlinskyi played in a friendly game on 15 July 1998 against Poland at home.

International games

International goals

Individual honours
 Ukrainian Footballer of the Year: 2003

References

External links 
 
 
 

Ukrainian footballers
Ukraine international footballers
Ukrainian expatriate footballers
Footballers from Kyiv
FC Dynamo Kyiv players
FC Dynamo-2 Kyiv players
AEK Athens F.C. players
FC Chornomorets Odesa players
FC Dnipro players
Ukrainian Premier League players
Super League Greece players
Expatriate footballers in Greece
Living people
1978 births
Association football forwards
Ukrainian expatriate sportspeople in Greece
Ukrainian football managers
FC Dynamo Kyiv non-playing staff